Swann Galleries is a New York City auction house founded in 1941. It is a specialist auctioneer of antique and rare works on paper, and it is considered the oldest continually operating New York specialist auction house.

The company has separate specialist departments for books, autographs and manuscripts, maps and atlases, photographs and photographic literature, prints and drawings, vintage posters, illustration art, and African-American fine art. Additionally, Swann conducts annual sales of printed and manuscript African Americana.  In total, Swann conducts over 35 catalogued live auctions a year.

History
Book dealer Benjamin Swann founded the family-owned firm in 1941.  In 1970, George Lowry acquired the business from Mr. Swann, and it is now headed by Nicholas D. Lowry, the third generation at the company’s helm.

For over thirty years, Swann has been located on East 25th Street, just one block east of Madison Square Park, at the boundaries of the historic Murray Hill, Gramercy Park, and Flatiron districts.

Affiliations
Swann is one of the founding members of International Auctioneers (IA), formed in 1993 by some of the world’s leading independent auction houses. Current European members are located in Stockholm, Cologne, Milan, Paris, Zurich, Geneva, and Vienna.

Swann is the only auction house that is a member of the Antiquarian Booksellers' Association of America, which actively promotes an ethical professionalism in the dealing and trading of rare books.

Many of the specialists at Swann share their expertise on PBS’ Antiques Roadshow, where they assess people’s antiques and collectibles in the quest for hidden gems.

References

 African-American Art Arrives
 Rare Cookbooks on the Auction Block
 Sportivo!

External links
 

Auction houses based in New York City
American companies established in 1941
Retail companies established in 1941
Commercial buildings in Manhattan
1941 establishments in New York City